Walter T. Hinton (10 November 1888 – 28 October 1981) was a United States aviator.

Hinton was born in a farming family in Van Wert, Ohio. Seeing a poster urging young men to "Join the Navy and See the World", he joined the United States Navy. He saw action in the 1914 United States occupation of Veracruz, Mexico. Hinton had a great fascination with early aircraft, and soon went into naval aviation.

Hinton achieved fame as one of the two pilots, along with Elmer F. Stone, of the Curtiss NC flying boat "NC-4", the first aircraft to make a transatlantic flight, in May 1919. After the successful completion of this journey, he was made a knight of the Order of the Tower and Sword by the Portuguese government on 3 June 1919. As a member of the NC-4 crew, he was awarded the Navy Cross and later received a Congressional Gold Medal in 1929.

Hinton's aeronautic adventures during the 1920s include exploring the Arctic by balloon, and a wayward flight on Navy balloon A-5598 from Rockaway Naval Air Station to Moose Factory, Ontario in the winter, which caused a month-long hike to civilization. Hinton and Kloor wrote letters home which their families sold to newspapers describing the flight, which prompted the Navy to start enforcing rarely used censorship rules. Hinton made the first flight from North America to South America (on the second try—he floated on a wing in shark infested waters off Cuba for a while at the end of the first try), and explored the Amazon rainforest by hydroplane.

He spent years touring as a speaker promoting aviation.

An airport in his birth town of Van Wert (KVNW) named in his honor as Walter Hinton Field. The 100-year anniversary of his transatlantic flight was celebrated on Walter Hinton Day, May 18, 2019 at the Van Wert County Regional Airport.

Hinton spent his retirement in Pompano Beach, Florida, where he delighted in sharing his memories with local children. One of his happiest events of his later years was being a special guest on an early supersonic transatlantic flight of the Concorde, making the trip which had first taken Hinton 19 days in less than four hours.

Hinton was President and founder of the Aviation Institute of U.S.A Washington D.C. in 1927 and 1928, where he published several periodicals on aviation. Periodicals included Opportunities in Aviation, The Wright Whirlwind Motor, Pioneers in Aviation, Aviation Progress, and Wings of Opportunity.

After his death in 1981, his ashes were interred at Arlington National Cemetery.

References

External links

1888 births
1981 deaths
People from Van Wert, Ohio
Aviators from Ohio
Recipients of the Air Force Cross (United Kingdom)
Recipients of the Navy Cross (United States)
Recipients of the Order of the Tower and Sword
Congressional Gold Medal recipients
Burials at Arlington National Cemetery